Denver is a major center of media in Colorado and the Mountain West region of the United States. The following is a list of media outlets based in the city.

Print

Newspapers
The Denver Post is the city's primary newspaper, published daily. Other papers published in the city include:

The Advocate, University of Colorado Denver student newspaper, weekly
Rocky Mountain Chinese Weekly,  Chinese language newspaper, weekly
Chinese American Post, Chinese language newspaper, weekly
Clarion, University of Denver student newspaper, weekly
Colorado Chinese News, Chinese language newspaper, weekly
The Colorado Episcopalian, Episcopal Diocese of Colorado newspaper, quarterly
The Colorado Leader, real estate news, weekly
Colorado Statesman, local political news, weekly
The Colorado Sun, online publication founded 2018
Denver Business Journal, business news, weekly
Denver Catholic Register, Roman Catholic Archdiocese of Denver newspaper, weekly
Denver Voice, homeless news, monthly
Intermountain Jewish News, Jewish American news, weekly
The Metropolitan, Metropolitan State University of Denver student newspaper, weekly
El Pueblo Catolico, Roman Catholic Archdiocese of Denver Spanish language newspaper
Viva Colorado, Spanish language newspaper, weekly
La Voz Nueva de Colorado, Spanish language newspaper, weekly
Westword, alternative newspaper, weekly

Radio
Denver is a principal city of the Denver-Boulder radio market. In its Fall 2013 ranking of radio markets by population, Arbitron ranked the Denver-Boulder market 19th in the United States. The market includes seven counties in north-central Colorado:  Adams, Arapahoe, Boulder, Broomfield, Denver, Douglas, and Jefferson.

The following is a list of radio stations which broadcast from and/or are licensed to Denver:

AM

FM

Local listeners can also receive the signal of radio stations broadcasting from nearby communities including Aurora, Centennial, Colorado Springs, Greenwood Village, Longmont, and Loveland.

Television
The Denver television market includes most of Colorado, much of the eastern half of Wyoming, and most of the Nebraska Panhandle. In its Fall 2013 ranking of television markets by population, Arbitron ranked the Denver market 17th in the United States.

The following is a list of television stations that broadcast from and/or are licensed to Denver, with network owned-and-operated stations highlighted in bold:

In addition, local viewers can receive the signal of television stations broadcasting from nearby communities including Fort Collins and Greeley.

References

Denver

Denver